North Carolina Highway 59 (NC 59) was an  primary state highway in the U.S. state of North Carolina that ran through Cumberland County from Interstate 95 (I-95) near Hope Mills to U.S. Route 401 Business (US 401 Bus.) in Owens, within the city limits of Fayetteville.

Route description
NC 59 was an urban route southwest of Fayetteville. NC 59 began at I-95 (exit 41) and proceeded north from there intersecting I-95 Bus. and U.S. Route 301 shortly thereafter at a partial cloverleaf interchange. NC 59 continued north entering the town of Hope Mills. NC 162 intersected the highway just north of downtown Hope Mills, as NC 59 continued north through the suburban parts of Fayetteville. NC 59 came to its northern end at US 401 Bus. (Raeford Road)

History
NC 59 was first commissioned in 1932 as a new primary highway from US 1/NC 50 in Raleigh following present day US 401 to Louisburg and ending at US 158/NC 48 in Warrenton. In 1957, NC 59 was renumbered in its entirety by US 401.

Today's alignment was commissioned in 1958 and initially it ran from US 401 west of Owens and around the north side of Fayetteville and ended at US 401 north of Fayetteville. In 1963, NC 59 was extended south through Hope Mills and ended at US 301 as an upgrade to State Routes 1141, 1118, and 1124. By 1968, the northern terminus of NC 59 was truncated to its final endpoint at US 401 Bus. in Owens. US 401 Bus. replaced the original alignment of NC 59 north of there. In 1982, when I-95 was opened around Fayetteville, NC 59 was extended to it.

In November 2022, at the request of both municipalities (Fayetteville and Hope Mills), the North Carolina Department of Transportation is decommissioned NC 59 to secondary road 1596. They asked for the change in an effort to redirect commercial truck traffic. The goal of the two cities is to make this route less congested and safer for pedestrians.

Major intersections

References

External links

NCRoads.com: N.C. 59

059
Transportation in Cumberland County, North Carolina
Transportation in Fayetteville, North Carolina